is a Japanese politician of the Liberal Democratic Party, a member of the House of Representatives in the Diet (national legislature).  He served as the Minister of Defense from 2 October 2018 to 11 September 2019.

Profile and career

A native of Beppu, Ōita and the son of Kei Iwaya, a member of the assembly of Ōita Prefecture, Takeshi Iwaya graduated the School of Political Science and Economics at Waseda University.

He was elected to the assembly of Ōita Prefecture in 1987 (serving for one term), and to the House of Representatives for the first time in 1990 as an independent. After losing his seat in 1993, he ran unsuccessfully for the house in 1996 but was re-elected in 2000.

His profile on the LDP website:
Member, Oita Prefectural Assembly
Parliamentary Secretary for Defense (Mori Cabinet)
Deputy Secretary-General of LDP
Senior Vice-Minister for Foreign Affairs (Abe Cabinet)
Director, National Defense Division of LDP

Positions
Iwaya is affiliated to the openly revisionist lobby Nippon Kaigi, and a member of the following right-wing groups at the Diet:
Japan Rebirth (創生「日本」- Sosei Nippon)
Nippon Kaigi Diet discussion group (日本会議国会議員懇談会 - Nippon kaigi kokkai giin kondankai)
Conference of parliamentarians on the Shinto Association of Spiritual Leadership (神道政治連盟国会議員懇談会) - NB: SAS a.k.a. Sinseiren, Shinto Political League, Shinto Seiji Renmei Kokkai Giin Kondankai
Diet Celebration League of the 20th Anniversary of His Majesty The Emperor's Accession to the Throne (天皇陛下御即位二十年奉祝国会議員連盟)
Conference to consider the true human rights (真の人権擁護を考える懇談会)
Conference of lawmakers to promote value-based diplomacy (価値観外交を推進する議員の会)
parliamentarians investigating the Japan Teachers' Union problem (日本教職員組合問題究明議員連盟)
Committee for promoting the reform of the Fundamental Education Law (教育基本法改正促進委員会 - Kyouiku kihonhou kaisei sokushin iinkai)
Parliamentarians acting to protect the Japanese territory (日本の領土を守るため行動する議員連盟)
Conference of young parliamentarians supporting the idea that the Yasukuni Shrine is a true national interest and desire for peace (平和を願い真の国益を考え靖国神社参拝を支持する若手国会議員の会)
Association for Building a Proper Japan (正しい日本を創る会 - Tadashii Nippon wo tsukurukai)
Association for a strong Japan (力強く日本を再生する会)

Iwaya gave the following answers to the questionnaire submitted by the Mainichi newspaper to parliamentarians in 2012:
in favor of the revision of the Constitution
in favor of right of collective self-defense (revision of Article 9)
in favor of reform of the National assembly (unicameral instead of bicameral)
in favor of reactivating nuclear power plants
against the zero nuclear power by 2030s
in favor of the relocation of Marine Corps Air Station Futenma (Okinawa)
in favor of evaluating the purchase of Senkaku Islands by the Government
in favor of a strong attitude versus China
against the participation of Japan to the Trans-Pacific Partnership
against a nuclear-armed Japan
against the reform of the Imperial Household that would allow women to retain their Imperial status even after marriage

References

External links 

  in Japanese.

1957 births
Living people
Politicians from Ōita Prefecture
Members of the Ōita Prefectural Assembly
Waseda University alumni
Members of Nippon Kaigi
Members of the House of Representatives (Japan)
Liberal Democratic Party (Japan) politicians
Japanese defense ministers